Kempston & Elstow Halt was a railway station on the Varsity Line which served the Bedfordshire town of Kempston in England. Opened in 1905, it was closed temporarily during both world wars and did not reopen after 1941, being officially closed in 1949.

History 

Kempston & Elstow was one of three halts opened by the London and North Western Railway in 1905 between Stewartby and Bedford. Their opening coincided with the introduction of a steam railmotor on the Varsity Line, and each was conveniently sited alongside a level crossing. Kempston Halt, as it was known until 1908, was constructed close to "Cow Bridge", an old road bridge which carried the present A421 over a tributary of the River Great Ouse. All three halts were opened on the same day and all were simultaneously temporarily closed as a First World War economy measure in 1917, reopening two years later only to close again in 1941 during the Second World War. This time, however, only one – Kempston Hardwick – was to reopen, the others officially closing as from February 1949.

The crossing near the station was staffed by a crossing keeper from 1846 to 1868 when the diversion of the road by the Midland Railway led to the removal of the crossing. A railway crossing cottage had been provided for the use of the keeper, and was later used by a porter from Kempston & Elstow Halt. Today it is located near the Kempston Interchange Park and the station building can still be seen from the B530.

Present day 
Nothing remains of the halt, yet the crossing keeper's cottage still remains as a private dwelling.

References 

Disused railway stations in Bedfordshire
Former London and North Western Railway stations
Railway stations in Great Britain opened in 1905
Railway stations in Great Britain closed in 1917
Railway stations in Great Britain opened in 1919
Railway stations in Great Britain closed in 1941
Kempston